Kildare South is a parliamentary constituency represented in Dáil Éireann, the lower house of the Irish parliament or Oireachtas. The constituency elects 4 deputies (Teachtaí Dála, commonly known as TDs) on the system of proportional representation by means of the single transferable vote (PR-STV).

History and boundaries
The constituency was first used at the 1997 general election, when the former 5-seat Kildare constituency was divided into Kildare South and Kildare North.

The Kildare South constituency spans the more rural southern and western areas of County Kildare, taking in the towns of Newbridge, Kildare, Athy, Caragh and many other areas. At the 2020 general election, it gained an extra seat to become a 4-seat constituency.

The Electoral (Amendment) (Dáil Constituencies) Act 2017 defines the constituency as:

TDs

Elections

2020 general election
Seán Ó Fearghaíl was Ceann Comhairle at the dissolution of the 32nd Dáil and therefore deemed to be returned automatically. The constituency was treated as a three-seater for the purposes of calculating the quota.

2016 general election

2011 general election

2007 general election

2002 general election

1997 general election

See also
Elections in the Republic of Ireland
Politics of the Republic of Ireland
List of Dáil by-elections
List of political parties in the Republic of Ireland

References

Dáil constituencies
Politics of County Kildare
1997 establishments in Ireland
Constituencies established in 1997